Adam John Blakeman (born 3 December 1991) is a professional English footballer who plays for Chorley. He began his career at Bolton Wanderers, before being released at the end of the 2012–13 season. He then signed for Hyde. Blakeman plays primarily as a left back but is equally adept playing in the centre or on the left side of midfield.

Career

Bolton Wanderers
Born in Southport, Blakeman started his professional career at Liverpool at the age of eleven. After seven years at the club, Blakeman left Liverpool and joined Bolton Wanderers, regularly playing in their reserve side. Blakeman signed a professional contract with Bolton in March 2011. A product of the youth system, he made his competitive debut in the League Cup tie at home to Macclesfield Town on 24 August 2011, coming on as a second-half substitute for Marcos Alonso.

He was released by Bolton at the end of the 2012–13 season.

Hyde
Blakeman signed for Conference Premier team Hyde in August 2013. He scored his first goal for the club against Forest Green Rovers in January 2014.

In January 2015, the club announced Blakeman's departure.

Ayr United
On 20 January 2015, Blakeman signed for Scottish League One club Ayr United. In explaining his decision to join the club, he cited his desire to join up again with former Bolton youth coach John Henry.

Blakeman made his debut for the club just four days after signing in a 1–1 draw against Stenhousemuir. Blakeman scored his first goals on 28 April 2015, in a 4–0 win over Stirling Albion.

At the end of the 2014–15 season, Blakeman was offered a new contract by the club.

Southport

The following season, Blakeman returned to England, where he signed for Southport, where he lined up with his brother, Liam. He made his Southport debut on 18 August 2015, playing on the left of midfield in a 2–1 loss against Gateshead. Blakeman scored his first Southport goal in a 1–0 win over Wrexham on 26 December 2015.

Chorley

Blakeman joined National League North's Chorley F.C. prior to the 2016–2017 season. On 8 October 2016, Chorley beat Harrogate Town F.C. 1–0 with Blakeman scoring a penalty to win the game. At the start of the new year, Chorley lost 3–1 against AFC Fylde, with Blakeman scoring Chorley's goal. After making it into the Promotion play-offs, their first game was at home against Kidderminster Harriers F.C. which they lost 1–0. They travelled to Kidderminster for the second leg, where a 2–0 win put them through to the play-off final against F.C. Halifax Town. The fixture was held on 13 May 2017, with an attendance of 7,920 fans. Chorley lost 2–1 with Blakeman scoring their only goal from a free kick.

Spennymoor Town

On 16 June 2020 Blakeman signed for Spennymoor Town.

Chorley
In May 2021 Blakeman re-signed for Chorley.

Personal life
He is the grandson of Larry Carberry, who won a League Championship medal with Ipswich Town in 1962 as a member of Alf Ramsey's team that won the Second Division the previous season. His elder brother Liam, played for a number of non-league clubs including Southport and Hednesford Town.

Career statistics

Honours
Chorley
Lancashire FA Challenge Trophy: 2017-2018

References

External links

1991 births
Living people
Association football defenders
Ayr United F.C. players
Bolton Wanderers F.C. players
Chorley F.C. players
Hyde United F.C. players
Southport F.C. players
Spennymoor Town F.C. players
English footballers
English people of Irish descent
Footballers from Widnes
National League (English football) players
Scottish Professional Football League players